The 1943 Chicago Cardinals season was the 24th season the team was in the league. The team failed to improve on their previous output of 3–8, losing all ten games. They failed to qualify for the playoffs for the 18th consecutive season.

Schedule

Standings

References

1943
Chicago Cardinals
Chicago
National Football League winless seasons